The Concert for Democracy in China was a benefit concert held in Hong Kong in support of the students involved in the 1989 Tiananmen Square protests. The concert was held on May 27, 1989, at the Happy Valley Racecourse on Hong Kong Island. The event lasted for 12 hours and raised over  (1.5 million US dollars) for the students in Beijing.

Event 
The event was hosted by James Wong, Phillip Chan, Eric Tsang, and John Shum. Shum stated in a later interview that all the performers enlisted voluntarily and were not invited.  Sing Pao Daily News reported that the event was attended by nearly one million people, while Ta Kung Pao reported around 500,000 participants. Other estimates state the event was attended by around 200,000 people.

Performers 

Andy Lau, Chow Yun-Fat, Alan Tam, Shing Fui-On, Loletta Lee, Chin Siu-ho, Maggie Cheung, Sharon Kwok, Cheung Kwok Keung and George Lam also delivered messages through a large screen on the stage.

North American tour

The concert also toured outside of Hong Kong in 1990, namely with North American stops in Vancouver, San Francisco, New York City, Washington DC, Los Angeles and Toronto.

Aftermath 
He was forced to sign a letter of remorse and released three days later, while the funds were confiscated by authorities in Beijing.

Donald Tsang attendance controversy 
In June 2006, Szeto Wah and other participants recalled seeing Donald Tsang attend the event. Tsang, then the director of administration for the government, would have broken civil service rules by attending the concert. However, Tsang denied "unequivocally" he ever attended the event, stating that he had merely run into Szeto Wah after having dinner with his son at the Hong Kong Jockey Club. At the 2006 commemoration of the 1989 protests in Hong Kong, Fernando Cheung also claimed that Donald Tsang attended the concert, which Tsang again denied.

Song list 
See list on Chinese Wikipedia.

See also 

Memorials for the Tiananmen Square protests of 1989
June 4th Museum

References

External links 

 
 

May 1989 events in Asia
1989 in Hong Kong
1989 Tiananmen Square protests and massacre
Politics of Hong Kong